Christopher Brandon Horner (born October 23, 1971) is an American retired professional road racing cyclist, who rode professionally between 1996 and 2019, and is the most recent American rider to win a Grand Tour.

A current resident of Bend, Oregon, Horner dominated the American road racing scene by winning the points standings in the 2002, 2003 and 2004 USA Cycling National Racing Calendar. He won the Vuelta a España in 2013, becoming the oldest winner of any of cycling's grand tours in the process.

Racing career

PAA–NutraFig (1995–96)
Horner turned professional in 1995 with the PAA–NutraFig team. He captured his first major victory in a stage win of the Tour DuPont in 1996.

Française des Jeux (1997–99)
He was then asked to ride in Europe with French team . From 1997 to 1999 he had three frustrating seasons with this team.

Mercury, Prime Alliance, Saturn, and Webcor (2000–2004)
In 2000, Horner returned to America to resume a record-setting domestic career, riding with Mercury in 2000, Prime Alliance in 2002, Saturn in 2003 and Webcor Builders in 2004. Horner has won almost every important race in the US racing calendar, with the notable exception of the USPRO National Championships.

Saunier Duval (2004–05)
Horner decided to move to  after his top-ten finish in the 2004 UCI Road World Championships because he wanted to give the Tour de France a try. After being injured in the beginning of 2005, Horner showed strong performance in the USPRO Championships and won his first major European victory by taking the sixth stage of the 2005 Tour de Suisse. He then earned his place on the 2005 Tour de France team and nearly won the Miramas to Montpellier stage when he and Sylvain Chavanel refused to cooperate in the final kilometers and were caught by the peloton.

Davitamon and Predictor (2006–07)
He made a move to the Belgian UCI ProTour squad  for the 2006 season. He took a stage victory at the Tour de Romandie, and finished the race in seventh overall. During both the 2006 Tour de France and the 2007 Tour de France, Horner was one of the most important domestiques for general classification contender Cadel Evans, who placed inside the top-five overall in both years.

For 2007, Horner signed with Ed Krall Racing for the cyclo-cross season.

Astana (2008–09)
Horner earned the nickname "The Smiler" for his unflappable expression of happiness, even during the most excruciating physical challenges, and "The Yahoo Kid" for his wild exclamations after winning a race. Teammates Levi Leipheimer and Lance Armstrong call him "The Redneck".

In the 2008 Cascade Cycling Classic Horner carried amateur cyclist and Nordic combined skier Bill Demong (who was from another team) with his broken bicycle to the finish line.

RadioShack (2010–11)

2010
In one of his strongest European campaigns, Horner garnered first overall at the Tour of the Basque Country, including a stage win in the critical 6th stage individual time trial, defeating overall threat Alejandro Valverde. Horner also achieved several top 10 placings in the Spring classics of La Flèche Wallonne, Liège–Bastogne–Liège and the Amstel Gold Race. He and his RadioShack teammates did well at the Tour of California, with Horner putting on a particularly strong performance in the last stage of the race as a member of a final breakaway at Thousand Oaks. Horner finished fourth overall, 64 seconds behind winner Michael Rogers, and just 39 seconds behind teammate Levi Leipheimer in overall time. His good form also resulted in a 9th place overall at the Tour de France, as the first-placed American rider, in spite of dedicating himself in the first stages to supporting his captain Lance Armstrong.

2011
In 2011, Horner continued his success at the Tour of the Basque Country with a second-place finish, as well as 4th at the Volta a Catalunya. Horner then accomplished another high-profile result by winning May's Tour of California stage race. He scored a major solo victory on the 4th stage, after making significant time gains on the day's final mountain finish in San Jose. He maintained his hold on the yellow jersey until the tour's queen stage, where he completed a two-man breakaway finish with teammate Levi Leipheimer to finalize the overall lead, and at age 39 became the oldest rider in history to win that tour. His participation at the Tour de France was short lived after a crash left him out of the competition.

RadioShack–Nissan (2012–2013)

2012
He started the Tirreno–Adriatico as his first race since July where he finished second after losing his lead in the final time trial to Vincenzo Nibali. He then finished 8th in the Tour of California, failing to defend his title. He then rode the Tour de France where he ended up finishing 13th overall after putting a good performance in the mountains.

2013

After suffering an injury in the beginning of 2013, Horner returned to action after winning stage 5 in the Tour of Utah and finishing 2nd overall.  Less than three weeks later, in stage 3 of the Vuelta a España, Horner attacked over the last kilometer to win the stage and take the overall lead in the race. By doing this, he became the oldest rider in history (41 years and 307 days) to win a stage and wear the leader's jersey in a Grand Tour. He won again on stage 10, another uphill finish, reclaiming the lead. and setting a new record of the oldest rider (41 years and 314 days) to win a stage in a Grand Tour. He lost the race lead on the following stage to Vincenzo Nibali, and fell to fourth overall; however, he moved up to second place overall – 50 seconds behind Nibali – before the race's final week. He reduced Nibali's lead by 22 seconds on stage 16, and 25 seconds on stage 18, to trail by 3 seconds. A six-second swing on stage 19  resulted in Horner taking a three-second lead into the penultimate stage, which ends with the climb up the ledgendary Alto de l'Angliru, one of the hardest climbs in all of cycling that has been both vilified as an act of "barbarism". and praised as a great challenge.

Nibali – who had been looking to complete a Giro–Vuelta double – tried to distance Horner on several occasions as they climbed into the clouds on the mountains on the Angliru with fans parting as the rode up  sections so steep that the camera bikes stalled and fell leaving no TV coverage for several minutes as they struggled to catch up. But Horner answered every attack by slowly reeling Nibali in before Nibali finally cracked on a hairpin turn on a 20% + section with just 1k remaining. However Horner continued opening the gap out to 28 seconds on the road by the finish line. But the second place time bonus gave him his race-winning margin of 37 seconds and Chris Horner won the Vuelta a España. It was Horners only grand tour win in his 20+ year professional career, and in winning this race he became the oldest  ever Grand Tour winner.

He left  at the end of the season, as his contract expired. He felt he was worth more than the team were willing to offer for a rider of his resume and ability.

Lampre–Merida (2014)
Horner joined  for the 2014 season. In April, while training in Italy for the Giro d'Italia, he was hit by a car driver who subsequently fled the scene. Horner suffered a punctured lung and broken ribs in the accident, jeopardizing his participation at the Giro d'Italia. He elected not to compete in the Giro d'Italia; on June 30, 2014, Horner was named in Lampre's Tour de France squad, with Rui Costa as team leader.

He placed second in the mountainous Tour of Utah which he raced in preparation for the Vuelta a España. However, Horner withdrew from the Vuelta ahead of the first stage due to his cortisol levels dropping below the threshold considered healthy by the Mouvement pour un cyclisme crédible, of which Lampre–Mérida is a member. The announcement followed Horner's usage of cortisone on prescription under a therapeutic use exemption to treat a case of bronchitis.

Lampre–Mérida opted not to extend Horner's contract, and in December 2014 he announced he had signed a deal with UCI Continental team  for 2015.

Team Illuminate (2018–2019)
He said that overcoming a bronchial infection that had plagued the tailend of his career had convinced him to come out of retirement. However, he eventually did not finish the road race.

Broadcasting career
In 2019, Horner joined the team of broadcaster NBC for their coverage of the Tour de France, acting as a commentator, and in August 2020 started his own YouTube show called 'The Butterfly Effect'.

Major results

1996
 1st Lancaster Classic
 1st Stage 1 Tour DuPont
 2nd Overall Redlands Bicycle Classic
 3rd Road race, National Road Championships
 3rd Overall Fitchburg Longsjo Classic
1997
 3rd GP Ouest–France
 3rd Nevada City Classic
1998
 7th Overall Tour du Poitou-Charentes et de la Vienne
 9th Grand Prix des Nations
1999
 9th Overall Circuit des Mines
2000
 1st  Overall Tour de Langkawi
 1st  Overall Redlands Bicycle Classic
 8th Overall Critérium International
 8th Route Adélie de Vitré
2001
 2nd Overall Cascade Cycling Classic
1st Stage 3
 5th Overall Redlands Bicycle Classic
1st Stage 5
2002
 1st USA Cycling National Racing Calendar
 1st  Overall Redlands Bicycle Classic
1st Stages 1 & 2
 1st  Overall Sea Otter Classic
1st Stage 3
 1st  Overall Nature Valley Grand Prix
1st Stage 3
 1st  Overall Fitchburg Longsjo Classic
 2nd Time trial, National Road Championships
 3rd Overall Cascade Cycling Classic
 9th San Francisco Grand Prix
2003
 1st USA Cycling National Racing Calendar
 1st  Overall Tour de Georgia
1st  Mountains classification
 1st  Overall Redlands Bicycle Classic
 1st San Francisco Grand Prix
 1st Stage 4 Cascade Cycling Classic
 2nd Overall Fitchburg Longsjo Classic
1st Stages 2 & 3
 3rd Overall Sea Otter Classic
 9th Lancaster Classic
2004
 1st USA Cycling National Racing Calendar
 1st  Overall Sea Otter Classic
1st Stage 2
 1st  Overall Redlands Bicycle Classic
1st Stages 1a (ITT), 1b & 2
 1st  Overall International Tour de Toona
 3rd Overall Tour de Georgia
 8th Road race, UCI Road World Championships
2005
 3rd Road race, National Road Championships
 5th Overall Tour de Suisse
1st Stage 6
 6th Lancaster Classic
2006
 7th Overall Tour de Romandie
1st Stage 2
 8th Liège–Bastogne–Liège
 10th Overall Paris–Nice
2007
 3rd Giro dell'Emilia
 5th Overall Tour de Romandie
 5th Coppa Sabatini
 10th Giro di Lombardia
2008
 7th Overall Tour of California
 7th Giro di Lombardia
2009
 2nd Overall Tour de l'Ain
1st  Points classification
2010
 1st  Overall Tour of the Basque Country
1st Stage 6 (ITT)
 2nd Overall Giro di Sardegna
 4th Road race, National Road Championships
 4th Overall Tour of California
 7th Overall Critérium International
 7th La Flèche Wallonne
 7th Liège–Bastogne–Liège
 8th Overall Tour de France
 9th Overall Critérium du Dauphiné
 10th Amstel Gold Race
2011
 1st  Overall Tour of California
1st Stage 4
 2nd Overall Tour of the Basque Country
 3rd Overall Volta a Catalunya
2012
 2nd Overall Tirreno–Adriatico
 7th Overall Tour of Utah
 8th Overall Tour of California
 9th Overall Tour of the Basque Country
2013
 1st  Overall Vuelta a España
1st  Combination classification
1st Stages 3 & 10
 2nd Overall Tour of Utah
1st Stage 5
 6th Overall Tirreno–Adriatico
2014
 2nd Overall Tour of Utah
 8th Overall Volta ao Algarve
2015
 4th Overall Tour d'Azerbaïdjan
 5th Road race, National Road Championships
 5th Overall Tour of Utah
 7th Overall Redlands Bicycle Classic
 9th Overall Tour of the Gila
2016
 9th Overall Tour of the Gila

General classification results timeline

References

External links

 
 USA Cycling biography
 

1971 births
American male cyclists
American Vuelta a España stage winners
Cyclists at the 2012 Summer Olympics
Living people
Olympic cyclists of the United States
Sportspeople from Bend, Oregon
Tour de Suisse stage winners
Vuelta a España winners
Cyclists from Oregon